Nanotechnology is a peer-reviewed scientific journal published by IOP Publishing. It covers research in all areas of nanotechnology. The editor-in-chief is Ray LaPierre (McMaster University, Canada).

Abstracting, indexing, and impact factor 
According to the Journal Citation Reports, the journal has a 2020 impact factor of 3.874.

It is indexed in the following bibliographic databases:
Chemical Abstracts
Compendex
Inspec
Web of Science
PubMed
Scopus
Astrophysics Data System
Aerospace & High Technology
EMBASE
Environmental Science and Pollution Management	
International Nuclear Information System

References

External links 

 

Nanotechnology journals
IOP Publishing academic journals
Weekly journals
Publications established in 1990
English-language journals